A Khap is a community organisation representing a clan or a group of North Indian castes or clans. They are found mostly in northern India, particularly among the  Jat people of Haryana and Uttar Pradesh, but also amongst other states like Rajasthan and Madhya Pradesh although historically the term has also been used among other communities. A Khap Panchayat is an assembly of Khap elders, and a Sarv Khap is an assembly of many Khap Panchayats.

Khaps are not affiliated with the formally elected government bodies and is instead concerned with the affairs of the Khap it represents. It is not affiliated with the democratically elected local assemblies that are also termed Panchayat. A Khap Panchayat has no official government recognition or authority, but can exert significant social influence within the community it represents. The Baliyan Khap of Jats as led by Mahendra Singh Tikait until 2011 is one that has gained particular media attention. Dahiya Khap is major khap of Jat community in Haryana.

History 

The Khaps evolved as tribal and village administrations. One of the terms used to denote the republic was the Khap.

Dahiya Khap is one of the oldest leading Khap of Jats.

These Khaps are found from Northwest India down to Maharastra, Madhya Pradesh, Malwa, Rajasthan, Sindh, Multan, Punjab, Haryana, Bihar and Uttar Pradesh.

Khaps have been dated back to the 14th or 15th century, as part of the social structure of the Hindu people, who lived in the region that is now north eastern Rajasthan,eastern  Haryana, and Western Uttar Pradesh. The Jats were originally pastoral, but settled down and became agricultural.

There are historical documentational evidences that reveal the organization of Meerut division's khaps into the sarvkhap panchayat as far back as the 13th century. Haryana Sarwakhap Panchayat was established in 664 A.D. There is also a native belief that claims that Harsha systematized the sarv–khap panchayat in the 7th century at Prayag (modern Allahabad) during his quinquennial assemblage.

During British colonial rule, influential khap members were chosen as officials for their local areas.

Structure 
The Khap consisted a unit of 84 villages. The individual villages were governed by an elected council, known as the Panchayat. A unit of seven villages was called a Thamba and 12 Thambas formed the Khap unit of 84 villages, though Khaps of 12 and 24 villages existed. Their elected leaders would determine which units would be represented at the Khap level. The Sarv Khap (or All Khap) Panchayat (Council) represented all the Khaps. The individual Khaps would elect leaders who would send delegates to represent their Khaps at the Sarv Khap. It was a political organisation, composed of all the clans, communities, and castes in the region.

Members of khap panchayats are all male, though they often make decisions affecting women. In Haryana, women are not allowed to be present at a panchayat, and are represented by their male relatives. Members of Sarva Jaateeya Venain Khap, one of the largest khap panchayats in Haryana, have instead said there are no female khap members because they feel uncomfortable attending, not because they are not allowed.

Decisions on social issues 

The Khap Panchayats frequently make pronouncements on social issues, such as abortion, alcohol abuse, dowry, and to promote education, specially among girls. In October 2012, one Khap Panchayat leader in Haryana blamed the eating of chow mein, a non-traditional food, for the rise in rape in India, while another suggested that the age of marriage should be dropped from 18 to 16 because being married would make young women less susceptible to rape.

Khaps have attracted attention in recent times for their decisions on marriage. Khaps have opposed marriages between members of different castes, of certain gotras from which intermarriage is prohibited, and of the same village. In July 2000, a panchayat nullified the marriage of Ashish and Darshana, two years after they had married and produced a son, on the basis that they were from two gotras prohibited to marry, and should have a brother-sister relationship. Punishments handed down by khap panchayats in marriage cases include fines, social ostracism, public humiliation, and expulsion from the village.

Due to cultural restrictions around marriage and the skewed sex ratio, families may have difficulty finding suitable brides, and occasionally go against gotra marriage prohibitions. There are also cases of men in Haryana who marry lower caste brides without having a khap panchayat be called.

Naresh Tikait, head of Bhalyan Khap, criticized love marriages, saying "Marriage is a union of two consenting families and not just two individuals. So all stakeholders should have a say in that. If parents take all the pains to educate their girls then they also have right over their marriages too."

The largest Khap in Haryana is the Satrol Khap, which allowed inter-caste marriage in 2014, providing the marriage is not within the same gotra, village, or neighbouring villages.

A 2015 Sarv Khap meeting launched a "Save daughters, educate daughter" movement.

The decisions of the patriarchal Khap Panchayats have often been associated with the practice of honour killing.  In 2007, a khap panchayat ordered the killing of Manoj and Babli, who married within the same gotra. The two were killed by members of Babli’s family.

Death Sentence in Honour killing: In State Of Haryana v. Ganga Raj- Delivered on 23 March 2010 in the Manoj Babli Honor Killing case, the sessions judge Vani Gopal Sharma of Karnal in Haryana has Awarded Capital Punishment under Section 302 IPC(Indian Penal Code)1860 to five family members of Babli including her brother Suresh, Uncles Rejender, Baru Ram and cousins Satish and Gurdev for killing the couple on 15 June 2007, considering it the "rarest of rare" case and life sentence to the Khap(caste panchayat) leader Ganga Raj under Section 302 IPC read with section 120B, IPC for hatching the conspiracy to kill the couple. More on Wikipedia

Criticism 
In recent times, the Khap system has attracted criticism from groups, citing the stark prejudice that such groups allegedly hold against others. The All India Democratic Women's Association has reported cases where the Khaps are alleged to have initiated threats of murder and violence to couples who marry outside of the circle.

The Supreme Court of India has declared Khap Panchayats to be illegal because they often decree or encourage honour killings or other institutionalised atrocities against boys and girls of different castes and religions who wish to get married or have married.

In a 2012 report to the Supreme Court, Raju Ramachandaran, a Senior Advocate appointed by the Court to assist it in public interest litigation actions against Khap Panchayats, called for the arrest of "self styled" decision makers and for proactive action by the police to protect the fundamental rights of the people. He also asked for the recommendations to be converted into directions applicable to all states and union territories of India until a law is enacted by the national parliament.

Power and influence 
Despite the criticisms against this institution, it remains popular in some parts of India because, in its benign form, it resolves disputes and achieves social order with less time and resources,compared to the court system which is lengthier and expensive. In addition, taking a case to court may result in community ire.

Sometimes, the Indian government avoids a direct confrontation with the panchayat especially in rural areas. In some cases in Haryana, the police and locally elected leaders have supported the decisions of the khap panchayat. Om Prakash Chautala, the former Chief Minister of Haryana, said in 2004 that "whatever the panchayat decides is right."

Om Prakash Dhankar, member of the BJP, said that khap panchayats "are a deciding factor in the electoral success of a candidate."

Unofficial caste 
There are sources that describe the Khap as unofficial caste system where the panchayat dominates all other members of the group. Like the function of traditional caste and family systems, this Indian traditional institution engages in dispute resolution and the regulation of members' behavior. The group uses violence to maintain a rigid structure that controls members particularly, women, Dalit, and youths. The panchayats aggressively push tradition and outlook in which caste divisions are desirable while violence towards lower castes is normal and acceptable. An important Khap ethos involves the commitment – for the good of the community – to work with one's body, heart and soul under the leadership of its leaders, who are believed to have high moral superiority. For this reason, these leaders are afforded the right to demand a member's life.

See also 

 Misl
 Jat Mahasabha
 Exogamy
 Guddu Rangeela
Caste panchayat

References

Further reading 

Community organizing
Dispute resolution
Haryanavi culture
Honour killing in India
Identity politics in India
Local government in India
Patriarchy
Social history of India